Karl Schrenk was an Austrian football player and manager. He played in two matches for the Austria national football team in 1909.

References

External links
 

Austrian footballers
First Vienna FC players
Austria international footballers
Association football midfielders
Austrian football managers
VfL Osnabrück managers
FC Aarau managers
Club Brugge KV head coaches
Alemannia Aachen managers
Austrian expatriate football managers
Expatriate football managers in Belgium
Austrian expatriate sportspeople in Belgium
Expatriate football managers in Switzerland
Austrian expatriate sportspeople in Switzerland
Year of birth missing
Year of death missing
Place of birth missing